is a Japanese manga artist. She is best known as the author of Sailor Moon, one of the most popular manga series of all time.

She has won several awards, including the 1993 Kodansha Manga Award for Sailor Moon.

Takeuchi is married to Yoshihiro Togashi, the author of YuYu Hakusho and Hunter × Hunter.

Early life
Takeuchi was born in Kofu, Yamanashi, Japan, to parents Kenji and Ikuko Takeuchi. She has a younger brother, Shingo. She gave the names of her relatives to the characters she created for Sailor Moon, and mentions this in interviews and in several comic strips she produced, in place of author notes.

Takeuchi attended Kofu Ichi High School. She wore a seifuku and joined the astronomy and manga clubs. These experiences influenced her work for Sailor Moon, in addition to her other pieces, such as Love Call and Rain Kiss. Her formative high school experiences influenced her trajectory to become a manga artist. Takeuchi's father encouraged her to pursue other career paths, in case she wouldn't find success as a professional artist, which is why she attended university to study chemistry.

Takeuchi graduated from the Kyoritsu College of Pharmacy, where she received a degree in chemistry and became a licensed pharmacist. Her senior thesis was called "Heightened Effects of Thrombolytic Actions Due to Ultrasound".

Career

1986–1997: Early work and success
After graduating from the Kyoritsu College of Pharmacy, at the age of 19, Takeuchi entered the manga industry by submitting her work Love Call to Kodansha; Takeuchi received Nakayoshi's New Artist award for Love Call. She worked steadily on one-shot pieces until writing Maria, which was published in Nakayoshi from early to mid-1990. This work, Takeuchi's first serial comic, was loosely based on Jean Webster's 1912 novel Daddy-Long-Legs and on her friend Marie Koizumi, who helped write it.

After completing Maria, Takeuchi worked on the ice-skating series The Cherry Project, which was serialized in Nakayoshi from late 1990 to 1991. While working on The Cherry Project, Takeuchi wanted to do a manga on outer space and girl fighters. Her editor, Fumio Osano, asked her to put the fighters in sailor suits. This concept would later become a one-shot called Codename: Sailor V, which would later begin serialization in RunRun. When Toei Animation planned to adapt her manga into an anime series, she reworked Sailor V and added four other superheroines.

In December 1991, Nakayoshi began serializing Sailor Moon, which became an instant hit. The success encouraged Takeuchi to work on both Sailor Moon and Sailor V from 1991 to 1997. However, RunRun was canceled with the November 1997 issue, and the planned Sailor V anime adaptation was canceled along with it. During that six-year period, she produced 60 chapters, which were collected in 18 volumes. The success of the manga led to a 200-episode anime adaptation, three animated films, numerous video games, and wide-ranging merchandising.

At the series' end, Takeuchi worked on PQ Angels for Nakayoshi. This gained a fair amount of popularity, but was canceled due to Kodansha losing seven pages of her manuscript. Takeuchi said that Toei Animation had the manuscript, therefore it would have been possible to create an anime adaptation of the series.

Takeuchi's own studio is called "Princess Naoko Planning" (PNP). Takeuchi established PNP to manage her properties, mainly Sailor Moon. The studio later encompassed Yoshihiro Togashi's work as well and appeared in the credits for such anime as Level E and Hunter × Hunter. Its name also appears on the musical credits for Shin Kaguya Shima Densetsu and other projects.

1998–2009
Following the loss of seven pages of Takeuchi's PQ Angels manuscript, Osano departed Kodansha and the plans for the Materials Collection were canceled. Takeuchi departed Kodansha for Shueisha.

On August 13, 1998, Takeuchi made her first appearance in the United States at the San Diego Comic-Con International convention for three days. That same year, she published the first Sailor Moon artbook since her departure from Kodansha, Sailor Moon Infinity Collection Art Book with limited releases.

While working on her short comic strip Princess Naoko Takeuchi Back-to-Work Punch!!, Takeuchi met Yoshihiro Togashi at a Weekly Shōnen Jump meeting hosted by Kazushi Hagiwara, and had a meeting arranged between them by voice actress Megumi Ogata. She collaborated with Togashi as an assistant (doing screentone) and as a manager on volume 1 of Hunter × Hunter. However, the work and the demands proved more than she had expected, and as a result, Takeuchi left Shueisha.

Around this time, Takeuchi conceived the idea for a one-shot called Toki☆Meka, which eventually turned into Toki☆Meca. Togashi had a similar idea at the same time as her, but never fully brought it to fruition. He helped somewhat with Toki☆Meka at this point in developing the idea by drawing some concept sketches, which Takeuchi showed in Toki☆Meca volume 1.

Togashi and Takeuchi married in 1999. From this marriage, the couple have two children: a son, born in January 2001, and a daughter, born in 2009.

After Kodansha's rights to Sailor Moon expired, Takeuchi returned to the publisher in 1999 to develop and publish the Materials Collection. She also began serializing Love Witch, but it was cancelled. Takeuchi started to work on the reprints of Sailor Moon and Sailor V, and published Toki☆Meca in Nakayoshi.

In 2003, Takeuchi became heavily involved in producing Pretty Guardian Sailor Moon, a tokusatsu television series based on Sailor Moon, as she had an interest in learning more about the anime industry.  This culminated in the creation of Pretty Guardian Sailor Moon. The series displays a plot that is heavily reliant on the manga and also explores many themes that the manga was unable to explore. She showed up at the official conference with a fist up, meaning "good luck", in Act Zero.

After the production of Pretty Guardian Sailor Moon ended in 2004, Takeuchi continued to work on Toki☆Meca. During the manga's serialization, Osano returned as her editor. Takeuchi also worked more closely with managing PNP and gave talks to college students. At the same time, she wrote a children's book titled Oboo-nu- to Chiboo-nu- as a birthday present to her son. (Togashi provided illustrations for the book; Takeuchi made mention of this in the back of the first volume of Toki☆Meca.) She still works on the website, updating it about once a month with new flash animations or profiles.

2010–2019
In 2012, it was announced that a new Sailor Moon anime adaptation was in development. With it, Takeuchi started a Kanzenban version of the manga, which was announced by Osano, and will include fixed past mistakes and new covers for the manga. Color pages are also included for the title pages. There was also an artbook announced, and she has been working on merchandise, which was announced by Osano on his Twitter feed.

The new reboot anime, Pretty Guardian Sailor Moon Crystal, debuted in July 2014. It streamed on Niconico bi-weekly, and ended in July 2015, spanning a total of 26 episodes, which cover the Dark Kingdom and Black Moon arc of the manga. Takeuchi wrote the ending theme song, under her penname, . The series eventually gained its 13-episode third season, Pretty Guardian Sailor Moon Crystal Season III, covering the Infinity arc of the manga (known as Death Busters in Japan), and aired weekly on Japanese television from April to June 2016.

2020–present
In 2020, the two volumes of official  of the Sailor Moon manga was released on June 29, with Takeuchi providing new illustrations for both covers.

In 2021, Takeuchi chief supervised the production of the two-part anime film, Pretty Guardian Sailor Moon Eternal The Movie, which adapted the Dream arc of the manga (known as Dead Moon in Japan), and acted as a "fourth season" for the Sailor Moon Crystal series. Both films were released in 2021 in Japanese theaters, with the first film on January 8, and the second film on February 11. Takeuchi also provided the lyrics for the theme song, under the name of "Sumire Shirobara".

In 2022, it was announced that Takeuchi will chief supervise the production of the sequel to Sailor Moon Eternal, titled Pretty Guardian Sailor Moon Cosmos The Movie. The two-part film will cover the Stars arc of the manga (known as Shadow Galactica in Japan), and will act as "fifth and final season" for the Sailor Moon Crystal series. Both films will be released in Summer 2023.

Works

Manga

Anime

Sailor Moon (1990's series)

Sailor Moon Crystal (2014 reboot series)

Illustrations
 Mermaid Panic Volumes 1–3 (written by Marie Koizumi)
 Atashi no Wagamama (written by Marie Koizumi)
 Zettai, Kore o Ubbatte Miseru (written by Marie Koizumi)

Written books
 Oboo-nu- to Chiboo-nu- (illustrated by Yoshihiro Togashi)
 A children's book written for her son's birthday.

Song lyrics
Takeuchi wrote the lyrics for a number of songs featured in the Sailor Moon anime and live-action series. Though mainly character-based image songs, they include a few theme songs.
These include:

 Ai wo Shinjiteru ("Believe in Love") – image song for Sailor Moon
 Chikara wo Awasete ("Combining Power") – image song for Kō Taiki/Sailor Star Maker
 Futtemo Haretemo -come rain or come shine- ("Whether It Rains or Shines -Come Rain or Come Shine-") – image song for Usagi Tsukino (Pretty Guardian Sailor Moon Crystal) (under the name of "Sumire Shirobara")
 Gekkō ("Moonbow") – ending theme of the first two seasons of Pretty Guardian Sailor Moon Crystal (under the name of "Sumire Shirobara")
 Ginga Ichi Mibun Chigai na Kataomoi ("Unrequited Love a Station Apart in the Galaxy") – image song for Kō Seiya/Sailor Star Fighter
 Honoo no Sogekimono ("Flame Sniper") – image song for Sailor Mars
 Initial U – image song for Sailor Uranus
 Katagoshi ni Kinsei ("Venus Over My Shoulder") – image song for Sailor Venus (Pretty Guardian Sailor Moon)
 Kirari*SailorDream! ("Sparkling Sailor Dream!") – theme song of Pretty Guardian Sailor Moon
 Luna! – image song for Luna
 Maboroshi no Ginzuisho ("Illusionary Silver Crystal") – insert song for the first season of Sailor Moon
 Mayonaka Hitori ("Alone at Midnight") – image song for Kō Yaten/Sailor Star Healer
 Nagareboshi He ("To the Shooting Star") - In-Universe song performed by the Sailor Starlights (Sailor Moon Sailor Stars and Pretty Guardian Sailor Moon Cosmos The Movie)
 Over Rainbow Tour – image song for Sailor Moon (Pretty Guardian Sailor Moon)
 Princess Moon – second ending theme of the first season of Sailor Moon
 "Rashiku" Ikimasho ("I'll Be As I Am") – second ending theme of Sailor Moon SuperS and Pretty Guardian Sailor Moon Eternal The Movie
 Route Venus – image song for Sailor Venus (Sailor Moon R)
 Sailor Star Song – opening theme song of Sailor Moon Sailor Stars
 Sērā Team no Theme ("Sailor Team's Theme") - insert song for Sailor Moon SuperS
 Senshi no Omoi ("Feelings of a Soldier") – image song for Sailor Neptune
 Todokanu Omoi ("My Friend's Love") – song for Three Lights ( Sailor Starlights)
 Tsukiiro Chainon ("Moon Color Chainon") – theme song of Pretty Guardian Sailor Moon Eternal The Movie (under the name of "Sumire Shirobara")
 We Believe You – image song for Sailor Jupiter

Awards
Takeuchi has won several awards, including the 2nd Nakayoshi Comic Prize for Newcomers for Yume ja Nai no Ne in 1985. She also won for "Love Call", which won Nakayoshi's New Artist award which debuted in the Nakayoshi Deluxe September 1986 issue. In 1993 she won the 17th Kodansha Manga Award for shōjo for Sailor Moon.

References

External links

1967 births
Japanese female comics artists
Japanese illustrators
Japanese pharmacists
Japanese Shintoists
Living people
Women manga artists
Manga artists from Yamanashi Prefecture
Sailor Moon
Winner of Kodansha Manga Award (Shōjo)
Women pharmacists
People from Kōfu, Yamanashi